Chyrpykty is a village in the Issyk-Kul Region of Kyrgyzstan. It is part of the Issyk-Kul District. Its population was 2,627 in 2021. Scientist Kasym Tynystanov was born in the village.

References

Populated places in Issyk-Kul Region